Phytometra ossea  is a species of moth of the family Erebidae. This species is found in Madagascar.

References

Boletobiinae